Turncurtovirus is a genus of viruses, in the family Geminiviridae. Dicotyledonous plants serve as natural hosts. There are three species in this genus.

Structure
Viruses in Turncurtovirus are non-enveloped, with icosahedral geometries, and T=1 symmetry. Genomes are circular and non-segmented, around 3.0kb in length.

Life cycle
Viral replication is nuclear. Entry into the host cell is achieved by penetration into the host cell. Replication follows the ssDNA rolling circle model. DNA-templated transcription is the method of transcription. The virus exits the host cell by nuclear pore export, and tubule-guided viral movement. Dicotyledonous plants serve as the natural host.

References

External links
 Viralzone: Turncurtovirus
 ICTV

Geminiviridae
Virus genera